Albert Carey Martin (September 16, 1879 – April 9, 1960) was an American architect and engineer. He founded the architectural firm of Albert C. Martin & Associates, now known as A.C. Martin Partners, and designed some of Southern California's landmark buildings. Martin is also credited with developing a system of reinforced concrete construction, along with reinforced brick masonry.

Early career
Born in LaSalle, Illinois, Martin received his Bachelor of Science degree in architectural engineering from the University of Illinois in 1902 and began his career as a draftsman at Brown-Ketcham Iron Works in Indianapolis, Indiana.  He worked in his early career in steel and iron for the Pennsylvania Railroad and Cambria Steel Company.

In 1904, Martin moved to Los Angeles, where he worked as a construction superintendent for Carl Leonardt & Company.  He next went to work as an engineer for Alfred Rosenheim, one of the city's leading architects.

Architectural career in Los Angeles

Martin formed his own firm, Albert C. Martin & Associates, in 1906. His firm went on to become one of the most prominent architectural firms in Los Angeles.

On October 16, 1907, he and Carolyn E. Borchard (February 21, 1883–June 9, 1959) were married in Oxnard, California. They had six children, including architect Albert C. Martin Jr., who went into business with his father, and 
J. Edward Martin (October 23, 1916 – November 22, 2004), a structural engineer who assumed management of the firm after World War II.

Martin's notable buildings include:
 Thomas Higgins Building - Completed in 1911 at 2nd and Main Streets, the 10-story Higgins Building was built by copper tycoon Thomas Higgins. Early tenants included Clarence Darrow, General Petroleum Corporation and the chancery office of the Roman Catholic Archdiocese of Los Angeles.
 Desmond's (department store), 1924. Beaux-Arts/Spanish Colonial Revival mix
 Los Angeles City Hall - Martin was also one of three prominent local architects, along with John Parkinson and John C. Austin, hired to design what has become the most recognized building in Los Angeles. The selection of an architect for the city hall led to fierce competition among the city's leading architects. The City Council selected the firm of Curlett and Beelman, but the Board of Public Works opted instead to hire a trio of the city's top architects in Martin, Parkinson, and Austin. Controversy continued when the architects turned in drawings for 28-story tower to house a municipal government that could adequately fit into the first four floors. In April 1926, Martin spoke in support of the design. Martin said: "The tower, one of the most efficient parts of the structure, will care for future growth. This tower, in fact, has a three-fold advantage - it gives the building a distinctly beautiful profile, eliminates the possibility of Los Angeles having to spend money in a few years to house the city's business, and admits of a maximum of outside office space." The city ultimately accepted the tower plan, and in March 1928 the Board of Public Works passed a resolution commending the architects "for the eminently satisfactory and beautiful design of the monumental building." It was the city's tallest building for three decades.
 May Company Wilshire department store (1939) was one of Martin's final landmark structures. The building is located in the Miracle Mile district on Wilshire Boulevard.
 Million Dollar Theater (Sid Grauman's Million Dollar Theatre) (1917) - While the auditorium was designed by William L. Woollett, Martin designed the 12-story tower that houses the theater. The building long housed the original headquarters of the Metropolitan Water District of Southern California, at 307 South Broadway.
 Queen of Angels Hospital
 St. Alphonsus Catholic Church - Martin designed this historic church in Fresno, California in 1913. 
 St. Monica Catholic Church - Built in Santa Monica from 1925 to 1926, this church was featured in the 1944 film classic Going My Way with Bing Crosby. It is also the home parish of California Governor Arnold Schwarzenegger. The parish hall, built in 1998, was designed by Frank Gehry.
 St. Vincent's Catholic Church - Located in the West Adams district, St. Vincent's and its dome are one of the most recognized churches in Los Angeles.

 Ventura County Courthouse - Martin's Roman Doric courthouse, built from 1912 to 1913 in Ventura, California, was added to the National Register of Historic Places in 1971, becoming the second building in Ventura County to be added to the National Register.

Recognition and later life
Martin and his associates ultimately designed an estimated 1,500 buildings. In 1959, the Los Angeles Chamber of Commerce recognized Martin for his contributions to the development of Los Angeles, by awarding him its annual "Man of Achievement" award. Martin's achievements included development of a system of reinforced concrete construction in 1907 and development of a method of reinforced brick masonry in 1933 to help safeguard the city's buildings against earthquakes.

Albert C. Martin died at age 80 in Los Angeles. The firm he founded, now known as A.C. Martin Partners, has continued as one of the city's leading architectural firms, and Martin's son, Albert C. Martin Jr., was one of its leading architects. A.C. Martin is now helmed by Albert, Jr.'s son, David C. Martin, and nephew, Christopher C. Martin.

References

External links 

 AC Martin Partners drawings and records on microfilm, 1906-2006, Getty Research Institute, Los Angeles. Accession No. 2015.M.14.

1879 births
1960 deaths
Architects from Los Angeles
Architects of Roman Catholic churches